The Cheshire Rugby Football Union (CRFU) is a rugby union governing body in the historic county of Cheshire and the Isle of Man. The union is the constituent body of the Rugby Football Union (RFU) for Cheshire. The CRFU administers and organises rugby union clubs and competitions in the county and administers the Cheshire county rugby representative teams.

Cheshire senior men's county team

Honours
County Championship Cup winners (3): 1950, 1961, 1998
County Championship Plate winners (2): 2006, 2009

Affiliated clubs
There are currently 52 clubs affiliated with the union, with teams at both senior and junior level.

Acton Nomads
Altrincham Kersal
Anselmians
Ashton-on-Mersey
Birkenhead Park
Bowdon
Caldy
Capenhurst
Carrington
Castletown (I.O.M.)
Chester
Christleton 
Congleton
Crewe & Nantwich
Douglas (I.O.M.)
Dukinfield
Ellesmere Port
Helsby
Holmes Chapel
Hoylake
Knutsford
Lymm
Macclesfield
Manchester Village Spartans
Marple
Manchester Metropolitan University
Moore RFC 
New Brighton
North Wales Exiles
North West Mercenaries
Northwich
Old Birkonians
Oldershaw
Oswestry
Oxton Parkonians
Port Sunlight
Prenton
Ramsey (I.O.M.)
Reaseheath College
Sale FC
Sale Sharks
Sandbach
Southern Nomads (I.O.M.)
Stockport
University of Chester
University of Law 
Vagabonds (I.O.M.)
Wallasey
Western Vikings (I.O.M.)
Wilmslow 
Winnington Park
Wirral

County club competitions 

The Cheshire RFU currently helps run the following club competitions for club sides based in Cheshire, parts of Merseyside and Manchester, and the Isle of Man:

Leagues

All leagues are by both the Cheshire RFU and Lancashire RFU and feature clubs based in Cheshire, Merseyside, Lancashire, Greater Manchester and the Isle of Man.

Lancs/Cheshire 1 - league ranked at tier 7 of the English rugby union system 
South Lancs/Cheshire 2 - tier 8 league
Lancs/Cheshire Division 3 - tier 9 league

Cups
Cheshire Cup - first played for in 1877 open to clubs playing at tiers 4-5 of the English rugby union league system
Cheshire Vase - founded in 2005 open to clubs playing at tiers 6-7
Cheshire Bowl - founded in 2009, open to clubs playing in tier 8
Cheshire Plate - founded in 1980, open to clubs in tier 9

Discontinued competitions
South Lancs/Cheshire 4 - a tier 10 league for regional sides that was discontinued at the end of the 2008-09 season
Cheshire (South) / Merseyside (West) - tier 8 leagues for sides from Cheshire and Merseyside that briefly replaced South Lancs/Cheshire 2 and South Lancs/Cheshire 3 for the 2015-16 season
South Lancs/Cheshire 3 - tier 9 league for regional sides that was abolished in 2017
North West 1 - tier 7 league for Lancashire, Cheshire and Cumbria clubs that was abolished in 2000
North West 2 - tier 8 league for Lancashire, Cheshire and Cumbria clubs that was abolished in 2000
North West 3 - tier 9 league for Lancashire, Cheshire and Cumbria clubs that was abolished in 2000

See also

Northern Division
English rugby union system

References

External links 
 

Rugby union governing bodies in England
Rugby union in Cheshire